Charles Lee Glenn Carr Jr. (August 10, 1967 – November 12, 2022) was an American Major League Baseball outfielder.

Career 
Carr topped the National League in stolen bases in 1993 with 58. He helped the Astros win the 1997 National League Central Division.

In an eight-season career, he played in 507 games, had 1,713 at-bats, 254 runs, 435 hits, 81 doubles, seven triples, 13 home runs, 123 RBI, 144 stolen bases, 149 walks, a .254 batting average, .316 on-base percentage, .332 slugging percentage, 569 total bases, 30 sacrifice hits, 10 sacrifice flies, and four Intentional walks.

Carr is perhaps remembered most for his hasty departure from the Brewers in 1997. After popping out to third base on a two balls, no strike count, after being signalled to take the next pitch, Carr was questioned by manager Phil Garner. Carr reportedly replied to Garner by saying in the third person: "That ain't Chuckie's game. Chuckie hacks on 2-0." He was released from the club shortly thereafter. He played the rest of that season with the Houston Astros where he hit his first postseason home run off John Smoltz in Game 3 of the NLDS. The home run would be the last at bat of his career.

Personal life and death
Carr died on November 12, 2022, at the age of 55.

See also
 List of Major League Baseball annual stolen base leaders

Sources

External links

Baseball Gauge

1967 births
2022 deaths
African-American baseball players
Arkansas Travelers players
Atlantic City Surf players
Baseball players from California
Bellingham Mariners players
Bisbee-Douglas Copper Kings players
Charlotte Knights players
American expatriate baseball players in Italy
Florida Marlins players
Gulf Coast Marlins players
Gulf Coast Reds players
Houston Astros players
Jackson Mets players
Long Island Ducks players
Major League Baseball center fielders
Mercuries Tigers players
Milwaukee Brewers players
Minor league baseball coaches
National League stolen base champions
New Orleans Zephyrs players
New York Mets players
Sportspeople from San Bernardino, California
Rimini Baseball Club players
St. Louis Cardinals players
Tidewater Tides players
Vermont Mariners players
Wausau Timbers players
Louisville Redbirds players
American expatriate baseball players in Taiwan
21st-century African-American people
20th-century African-American sportspeople